"Ça va pas changer le monde" ("It Won't Change the World") is a song by Joe Dassin from his 1975 album Joe Dassin (Le Costume blanc).

Released as a single, in France it was number one on the singles sales chart for two consecutive weeks from January 22 to February 4, 1976.

Charts

References 

1977 songs
1977 singles
Joe Dassin songs
French songs
CBS Records singles
Songs written by Pierre Delanoë
Songs written by Claude Lemesle
Songs written by Joe Dassin
Number-one singles in France
Song recordings produced by Jacques Plait